Shot Full of Love is the fifth studio album by American country music artist Billy Ray Cyrus. It features the single "Busy Man", which peaked at number 3 in early 1999, becoming Cyrus's first Top Ten country hit since "Somebody New" in 1993. The album's title song is a cover of a song written by songwriter Bob McDill and originally recorded by Juice Newton in 1981, in 1983 by the Nitty Gritty Dirt Band, and a number 73-peaking single in 1990 for Jennifer McCarter and The McCarters. "Time for Letting Go" is a cover of the 1990 Jude Cole hit. This was also his last studio album for the Mercury Records label. The album sold more than 220,000 copies worldwide. After that album's release, Billy Ray Cyrus left Mercury Records for Monument Records in 1999.

Track listing

Chart performance

Albums

Singles

Personnel

Main Musicians
Billy Ray Cyrus - lead vocals, background vocals
J. T. Corenflos - electric guitar
Mark Douthit - saxophone
Dan Dugmore - steel guitar
Owen Hale - drums
Jimmy Hall - background vocals
Mike Henderson - electric guitar
Dann Huff - electric guitar
Paul Leim - drums
Brent Mason - electric guitar
Dave Pomeroy - bass guitar
Gary Prim - keyboards
John Wesley Ryles - background vocals
Bruce Watkins - banjo
Biff Watson - acoustic guitar
John Willis - acoustic guitar
Glenn Worf - bass guitar

1998 albums
Billy Ray Cyrus albums
Mercury Nashville albums
Albums produced by Keith Stegall